Friedrich Andreas Sigismund Leuckart (26 August 1794 – 25 August 1843) was a German doctor and naturalist.

He was born in Helmstedt in Lower Saxony and studied medicine at the University of Göttingen. From 1816 he made several voyages of exploration.

In 1823 he was appointed privatdozent at the University of Heidelberg and taught comparative anatomy, zoology and veterinary science as an associate professor starting in 1829. In 1832 he moved to Freiburg as a full professor and continued his teaching there.

He wrote notable works on marine invertebrates, in particular Versuch einer naturgemaessen Eintheilung der Helminthen ("Towards a natural taxonomy of the helminths", 1827) and Einleitung in die Allgemeinen Naturgeschichte ("Introduction to general natural history", 1832).

He is commemorated by the parasitic worm species Calliobothrium leuckartii (Van Beneden, 1850).

He was the uncle of the zoologist Rudolf Leuckart (1822–1898).

Bibliography 
 Leuckart F .S. (1828). Breves animalium quorundam maxima ex parte marinorum descriptiones. Heidelberg, Oßwald, 24 pp., one unnumbered plate.

References and external links 
 

1794 births
1843 deaths
People from Helmstedt
University of Göttingen alumni
Academic staff of the University of Freiburg
Academic staff of Heidelberg University
German naturalists
19th-century German zoologists